The province of the South Kalimantan in Indonesia is divided into regencies which in turn are divided administratively into districts, known as Kecamatan.

The districts of South Kalimantan, with the regency each falls into, are as follows:

Alalak, Barito Kuala
Aluh Aluh, Banjar
Amuntai Selatan, Hulu Sungai Utara
Amuntai Tengah, Hulu Sungai Utara
Amuntai Utara, Hulu Sungai Utara
Angkinang, Hulu Sungai Selatan
Angsana, Tanah Bumbu
Anjir Muara, Barito Kuala
Anjir Pasar, Barito Kuala
Aranio, Banjar
Astambul, Banjar
Awayan, Balangan
Babirik, Hulu Sungai Utara
Bakarangan, Tapin
Bakumpai, Barito Kuala
Banjang, Hulu Sungai Utara
Banjarbaru Selatan, Banjarbaru
Banjarbaru Utara, Banjarbaru
Banua Lawas, Tabalong
Barabai, Hulu Sungai Tengah
Barambai, Barito Kuala
Batang Alai Selatan, Hulu Sungai Tengah
Batang Alai Tengah, Hulu Sungai Tengah
Batang Alai Timur, Hulu Sungai Tengah
Batang Alai Utara, Hulu Sungai Tengah
Bati Bati, Tanah Laut
Batu Ampar, Tanah Laut
Batu Benawa, Hulu Sungai Tengah
Batu Licin, Tanah Bumbu
Batu Mandi, Balangan
Belawang, Barito Kuala
Beruntung Baru, Banjar
Bintang Ara, Tabalong
Binuang, Tapin
Bungur, Tapin
Candi Laras Selatan, Tapin
Candi Laras Utara, Tapin
Cempaka, Banjarbaru
Cerbon, Barito Kuala
Daha Barat, Hulu Sungai Selatan
Daha Selatan, Hulu Sungai Selatan
Daha Utara, Hulu Sungai Selatan
Danau Panggang, Hulu Sungai Utara
Gambut, Banjar
Halong, Balangan
Hampang, Kotabaru
Hantakan, Hulu Sungai Tengah
Haruai, Tabalong
Haruyan, Hulu Sungai Tengah
Hatungun, Tapin
Haur Gading, Hulu Sungai Utara
Jaro, Tabalong
Jejangkit, Barito Kuala
Jorong, Tanah Laut
Juai, Balangan
Kalumpang, Hulu Sungai Selatan
Kandangan, Hulu Sungai Selatan
Karang Bintang, Tanah Bumbu
Karang Intan, Banjar
Kelua, Tabalong
Kelumpang Barat, Kotabaru
Kelumpang Hilir, Kotabaru
Kelumpang Hulu, Kotabaru
Kelumpang Selatan, Kotabaru
Kelumpang Tengah, Kotabaru
Kelumpang Utara, Kotabaru
Kertak Hanyar, Banjar
Kintap, Tanah Laut
Kota Tanjung
Kuranji, Tanah Bumbu
Kurau, Tanah Laut
Kuripan, Barito Kuala
Kusan Hilir, Tanah Bumbu
Kusan Hulu, Tanah Bumbu
Labuan Amas Selatan, Hulu Sungai Tengah
Labuan Amas Utara, Hulu Sungai Tengah
Lampihong, Balangan
Landasan Ulin, Banjarbaru
Limpasu, Hulu Sungai Tengah
Lokpaikat, Tapin
Loksado, Hulu Sungai Selatan
Mandastana, Barito Kuala
Marabahan, Barito Kuala
Martapura Barat, Banjar
Martapura Timur, Banjar
Martapura, Banjar
Mataraman, Banjar
Mekar Sari, Barito Kuala
Mentewe, Tanah Bumbu
Muara Harus, Tabalong
Muara Uya, Tabalong
Murung Pudak, Tabalong
Padang Batung, Hulu Sungai Selatan
Paminggir, Hulu Sungai Utara
Pamukan Barat, Kotabaru
Pamukan Selatan, Kotabaru
Pamukan Utara, Kotabaru
Pandawan, Hulu Sungai Tengah
Panyipatan, Tanah Laut
Paramasan, Banjar
Paringin Selatan, Balangan
Paringin, Balangan
Pelaihari, Tanah Laut
Pengaron, Banjar
Piani, Tapin
Pugaan, Tabalong
Pulau Laut Barat, Kotabaru
Pulau Laut Kepulauan, Kotabaru
Pulau Laut Selatan, Kotabaru
Pulau Laut Tengah, Kotabaru
Pulau Laut Timur, Kotabaru
Pulau Laut Utara, Kotabaru
Pulau Sebuku, Kotabaru
Pulau Sembilan, Kotabaru
Rantau Badauh, Barito Kuala
Rantau Bujur, Banjar
Salam Babaris, Tapin
Sambung Makmur, Banjar
Sampanahan, Kotabaru
Satui, Tanah Bumbu
Simpang Empat, Banjar
Simpang Empat, Tanah Bumbu
Simpur, Hulu Sungai Selatan
Sungai Durian, Kotabaru
Sungai Loban, Tanah Bumbu
Sungai Pandan, Hulu Sungai Utara
Sungai Pinang, Banjar
Sungai Raya, Hulu Sungai Selatan
Sungai Tabuk, Banjar
Sungai Tabukan, Hulu Sungai Utara
Tabukan, Barito Kuala
Tabunganen, Barito Kuala
Takisung, Tanah Laut
Tamban, Barito Kuala
Tambang Ulang, Tanah Laut
Tanjung, Tabalong
Tanta, Tabalong
Tapin Selatan, Tapin
Tapin Tengah, Tapin
Tapin Utara, Tapin
Tebing Tinggi, Balangan
Telaga Langsat, Hulu Sungai Selatan
Upau, Tabalong
Wanaraya, Barito Ku
Haur Gading, Hulu Sungai Utara
Paminggir, Hulu Sungai Utara
Karias Dalam, Banjang

 
South Kalimantan